Christos Bourbos (born 1 June 1983) is a Greek former professional footballer who played as a right-back.

Career

PAS Giannina
He played in PAS Giannina for three seasons (2001–2004) playing as a striker. He made his first 7 appearances with the club in the 2001–02 season as a rising star, helping the club to be promoted in the Greek Super League. But the next year 2002–03 did not be among the first priorities of the coach, the club is relegated and started to play the year after (2003–04 season) when the club is playing in Football League making 24 appearances. During these 3 periods he scored only two goals but he made 17 assists, being the first for his club.

AEK Athens
After his move to AEK Athens head coach Fernando Santos wanted to make him a right back. As a result, in one of his latest interviews, he stated that his natural position is that of the right back.

In his first season in AEK Athens, he was an indispensable member of the club (as well in Greece under 21), contributing with many assists. He managed to being among the first priorities of Santos having 15 appearances in the League, 6 in the Greek Cup and two in UEFA Europa League. An injury in 2005, deprived him from playing in the starting XI, hence in season 2005–2006 having just 2 appearances (in the Greek Cup).

Kerkyra
In 2006–2007, Llorenç Serra Ferrer having two other Right Defenders (Nikolaos Georgeas and Martin Albano Pautasso) proposed him a loan move, at first, to Niki Volou (a Second Division team). However, Bourbos refused. But just a few hours before the transfer window deadline Kerkyra made an offer for Bourbos' loan, including his annual wage, managing to loan him for the rest of the season. He returned to AEK at the end of the season as he was not in the plans of Kerkyra's coach Babis Tennes.

Iraklis
On 27 June 2008, Bourbos signed with Iraklis on a two-year contract for an undisclosed fee. A day before his deal with the club Bourbos stated in Sports Metropolis: " I feel bitterness leaving AEK. I talked with the president Antonis Remos but mostly Ilias Poursanidis. I will sign for two years. Iraklis wants to make a strong team. I did not play often with AEK and I expects to play with my new club. This is a reason why I decided to join the club, besides the fact that I will continue playing in the highest level (i.e. Super League)."

His career is declining and during 1,5-year in Iraklis did not succeed to make the difference. He made his debut with the club in a 2–1 home loss against Panserraikos. Eventually he left the club due to financial problems.

In April 2011, after his departure from the club, newspapers claimed that the club still owes him €35,580. The player expected to take legal action. This means that if the club continues to prove inconsistent with the player could face a deduction of points. Already spokesman footballer Lakis Simeoforidis an ex-player and advocate, has informed EPO and Super League, in order to start all the necessary procedures and informing the Board of License Commission.

OFI Crete 
OFI did not actually being among his first priorities, but the club gave him the opportunity to celebrate another promotion to the Greek Super League and put him in the football 'map' again. On 26 September 2010, he made his debut with the club in a 0–0 home draw against Kallithea. In January 2012, he scored the only goal with the club in a 3–1 away win against Panetolikos for the Greek Cup. He made 99 appearances in all competitions with the club scoring one goal.

It seemed for long time that something's up with Bourbos and finally suspicions, took flesh and bones. Christos Bourbos filed an appeal to safeguard his salaries, which exceed €320,000! The player who has a contract with OFI Crete, tried to come to an agreement with the president of the club Manthos Poulinakis, but this never happened. The 30-year-old right-back, took the decision to make the appeal as "I got tired of waiting and fooling him. The debts have to do with my presence in the club in the last three years, and each time, I did not take the money provided in my contract." the player said. In the 2013–14 season Bourbos was one of the best players of the club.  The blow is economical for OFI Crete and if the player is left free, the club loses a key member. The appeal of Bourbos added to that of Ricardo Verón, for a similar reason is clearly a big thorn for the club.

Panathinaikos
On 7 July 2014 Bourbos has signed a two years' contract with Panathinaikos. On 30 November 2015, according to newspapers' rumours Christos Bourbos is expected to leave Panathinaikos in January transfer window, because they are not in the plans of manager Andrea Stramaccioni, as he played only one match in 2015-16 season. The right defender is a transfer target of Veria. On 10 January 2016, Bourbos is finally expected to leave Panathinaikos within the month with a small compensation for his contract termination. On 3 February 2016,Panathinaikos terminated Bourbos's contract by immediate effect. The Greek right-back was not among Andrea Stramaccioni's plans and both sides took the decision to terminate his contract.

Aris
On 18 July 2016, Aris officially announced the signing of experienced right defender, who was recently released from Panathinaikos, until the summer of 2018.

References

External links
Profile at epae.org

1983 births
Living people
Greek footballers
Greece under-21 international footballers
Association football defenders
Association football wingers
Super League Greece players
PAS Giannina F.C. players
AEK Athens F.C. players
A.O. Kerkyra players
Iraklis Thessaloniki F.C. players
OFI Crete F.C. players
Panathinaikos F.C. players
Footballers from Ioannina